= Jihad-e-Akbar =

For the Islamic concept of Jihad-e-Akbar (The Greater Struggle), see:

- Jihad-e-Akbar in mainstream Islam
- Jihad-e-Akbar in Ismailism
